Carrizo de la Ribera is a town and municipality in the Province of León, Castile and León, Spain. According to the 2008 census (INE), the municipality has a population of 2,554 inhabitants. It is situated in the western bank of the Rio Órbigo. In addition to Carrizo, the municipality includes the villages of Huerga del Río, La Milla del Río, Quiñones del Río and Villanueva de Carrizo.

According to traditional sources, the town was originated by the depopulation of two earlier nearby towns: San Miguel de las Ollas and Villar de las Ollas, which were devastated by fire.

Main sights 
 Female Cistercian Trappists monastery of Santa María de Carrizo, founded in 1176 and declared national monument in 1974.

References

Municipalities in the Province of León